Henri Boris Kagan (born 15 December 1930) is currently an emeritus professor at the Université Paris-Sud in France. He is widely recognized as a pioneer in the field of asymmetric catalysis.  His discoveries have had far-reaching impacts on the pharmaceutical industry.

He graduated from the Sorbonne and École nationale supérieure de chimie de Paris and carried out his PhD under J. Jacques at the Collège de France. Subsequently, he was a research associate with A. Horeau. He then moved to Université Paris-Sud, Orsay where he is emeritus professor.  A landmark in his research was the development of C2-symmetric ligands, e.g., DIOP for asymmetric catalysis. This discovery led to the discovery of many related ligands that support catalysts used in a variety of practical applications.

Honors
Dr Kagan is a member of the French Academy of Sciences and has won many awards in the field including:  Silver Medal of the French National Scientific Research Center, Prelog Medal, August-Wihelm-von Hoffman Medal, Nagoya Medal of Organic Chemistry, Tetrahedron Prize for Creativity in Organic Chemistry, Wolf Prize in Chemistry,  Grand Prix de la Fondation de la Maison de la Chimie, Chevalier de la Légion d'honneur, JSPS Award for Eminent Scientists, Ryoji Noyori Prize, and the 2005 Benjamin Franklin Medal.

In 2001 controversy was caused when Kagan was not given the Nobel prize which had been shared by K. Barry Sharpless of the Scripps Research Institute in La Jolla, California, Ryōji Noyori of Nagoya University, Japan, and William Knowles, formerly of Monsanto Company in St Louis, Missouri, for work on catalytic asymmetric synthesis. It was thought that as Kagan was one of the pioneers of the field he too should have been honoured. However, as the prize can be given to a maximum of three people he was left off.

References

 Short biography of Kagan

1930 births
Living people
People from Boulogne-Billancourt
20th-century French chemists
Members of the French Academy of Sciences
University of Paris alumni
Academic staff of the University of Paris
Wolf Prize in Chemistry laureates